Live at Montreux 1991/1992 is a Tori Amos live album and DVD set, released on September 22, 2008, in the United Kingdom and on September 30, 2008, in the United States, featuring two separate performances at the Montreux Jazz Festival early in her career. The first 10-song set was recorded on July 3, 1991, with the second 9-song set recorded one year later on July 7, 1992. The bulk of the set list for each show was taken from Amos' solo debut album Little Earthquakes.

Eagle Rock Entertainment, a distributor for many releases of Montreux Jazz Festival performances, released the CD and DVD sets over 15 years after these performances were originally recorded.

Track listing
The complete set lists for the 1991 and 1992 performances are available on the DVD and the two-disc European/Latin American CD. The single-disc North American CD release features all but three songs from both performances (the exceptions being "Silent All These Years", "Crucify" and "Happy Phantom" from the 1992 show). The three omitted tracks were made available as a digital download only.

Personnel
 Tori Amos – vocals, piano
 Jon Astley – Mastering

Release history
While audio bootlegs of these two performances have been circulating for many years, this is the first official release for this pair of early Amos performances. The same footage was released on Blu-ray format in both the United Kingdom and the United States in December 2008.  It was released on vinyl as a 2xLP in the UK and Europe in 2014, and again in Europe in 2019.

References

Tori Amos video albums
Tori Amos live albums
2008 video albums
Live video albums
Albums recorded at the Montreux Jazz Festival
2008 live albums